Sylviane Anna Diouf is a historian and curator of the African diaspora. She is a visiting scholar at the Center for the Study of Slavery and Justice, Brown University and a member of the Scientific Committee of the International Coalition of Sites of Conscience. Her contribution as a social historian, she stressed, "may be the uncovering of essential stories and topics that were overlooked or negated, but which actually offer new insights into the experience of the African Diaspora. A scholar said my work re-shapes and re-directs our understanding of this history; it shifts our attention, corrects the historical record, and reveals hidden and forgotten voices."

Early life and education
Diouf was born in France, the daughter of a Senegalese physicist and a French school principal. She is a descendant of Khaly Amar Fall (1555-1638) founder, in 1603, of Pir, the Senegalese institute of higher Islamic studies. Historical figures such as Sulayman Bal and Abdel Kader Kane who blocked the slave trade on the Senegal River in the 18th century studied at Pir. Many Islamic reformists and later opponents of colonization were also students there and in 1870 the French burned down the school. But it was rebuilt and still exists. Diouf studied at Université Denis Diderot in Paris and has lived and traveled extensively in Europe, Africa, the Americas and Asia. She lives in New York.

Academic work
In addition to publishing pioneering scholarly works on African Diasporan themes, Diouf has written black history children's books, curated gallery and online exhibitions, lectured widely on the global black experience, and appeared as an expert in documentary films." 

Her book Dreams of Africa in Alabama: The Slave Ship Clotilda and the Story of the Last Africans Brought to America (Oxford University Press, 2007) is the first to tell the story, in minute details, of the 110 young Africans from Benin and Nigeria, who were brought in July 1860 to Alabama on the last recorded slave ship to the United States. It received the Wesley Logan Prize of the American Historical Association and the James Sulzby Award of the Alabama Historical Association. It was a finalist for the Hurston/Wright Legacy Award. The discovery, in 2019, of the wreck of the Clotilda in Mobile has brought international attention to this story.

Diouf is the author of Slavery's Exiles: The Story of the American Maroons (New York University Press, 2014). It is the first book to detail the experience of the men, women, and children who fled slavery and found refuge in the woods and swamps of the United States. Pulitzer Prize-winning historian Eric Foner noted that Slavery's Exiles is "an important addition to our understanding of slave society and black resistance". and interviewed Diouf for BookTV.

Servants of Allah: African Muslims Enslaved in the Americas (New York University Press, 1998), the first book on the topic, has been praised for its detailed, well-written, and well-researched study of West African Muslims in 20 colonies/countries of the Americas from the 16th to the 19th centuries.  Through an abundance of primary sources, Diouf explores the lives of individuals and communities focusing on expressions of faith, continued adherence to Islam, material culture, literacy, resistance, revolts, influence on non-Muslim communities and the Muslims' legacy. A 15th-anniversary, expanded, illustrated and updated edition was published in 2013.

Diouf gave the keynote address to the United Nations General Assembly on March 25, 2015, during the commemoration of the International Day of Remembrance of the Victims of Slavery and the Transatlantic Slave Trade. She is the editor of the critically acclaimed Fighting the Slave trade: West African Strategies (Ohio University Press, 2003), the first book to study African resistance to the slave trade. She co-edited Black Power 50 andIn Motion: The African-American Migration Experience (National Geographic, 2005). 

She has written several books on African history and on slavery for younger readers. She received the 2001 Africana Book Award for Older Readers from the African Studies Association for her book Kings and Queens of West Africa, part of a four-book series (Scholastic, 2000). She authored a book on the lives of children enslaved in the United States, Growing Up in Slavery (Lerner Publishing Group, 2001); and her fiction book Bintou’s Braids (Chronicle Books, 2001) has been published in the US, France, and Brazil.

Diouf has appeared on PBS in the documentaries This Far by Faith: African-American Spiritual Journeys, Prince Among Slaves, Cimarronaje en Panama, The Neo African Americans and History Detectives. She has lectured internationally and was the inaugural Director of the Lapidus Center for the Historical Analysis of Transatlantic Slavery at the Schomburg Center for Research in Black Culture of The New York Public Library.

Books
Black Power 50, 2016, The New Press
Slavery's Exiles: The Story of the American Maroons, 2014, New York University Press
Servants of Allah: African Muslims Enslaved in the Americas, 15th anniversary edition, 2013, New York University Press
Dreams of Africa in Alabama: The Slave Ship Clotilda and the Story of the Last Africans Brought to America, 2007, Oxford University Press
In Motion: The African-American Migration Experience, 2005, National Geographic Society
Fighting the Slave Trade: West African Strategies, 2003, Ohio University Press
Servants of Allah: African Muslims Enslaved in the Americas, 1998, New York University Press
Bintou's Braids, 2001, Chronicle Books. French and Brazilian editions.
Growing Up in Slavery, 2001, Lerner Publishing Group
Kings and Queens of Africa, 2000, Scholastic

Articles and chapters in edited books
 From the Holds of the Clotilda to African Town, The Unesco Courier, Fall 2019

What Islam Gave the Blues, Renovatio, Spring 2019

Borderland Maroons in Fugitive Slaves and Places of Freedom in North America, D. A. Pargas, ed. University Press of Florida Press, 2018.

'‘God Does Not Allow Kings to Enslave Their People’ ”: Islamic Reformists and the Transatlantic Slave Trade”', in A Muslim American Slave: The Life of Omar ibn Said, Ala Alryyes, ed. Madison: The University of Wisconsin Press, 2011

African Resistance to the Transatlantic Slave Trade, in 200 Years Later… Commemorating the 200 year anniversary of the abolition of the Transatlantic Slave Trade Berlin: Werstatt Der Kulturen, 2008

Muslims and the Transatlantic Slave Trade, Seasons, Spring-Summer 2005

The West African Paradox, in Muslims' Place in the American Public Square: Hopes, Fears, and Aspirations, Zahid Bukhari, ed. Altamira Press, 2004

African Muslims in Bondage: Realities, Memories, and Legacies, in Monuments of the Black Atlantic: History, Memory and Politics, Maria Diedrich, Joanne M. Braxton, eds. Hamburg: Lit Verlag, 2004

Manding in the Americas, in Trans-Atlantic Dimensions of Ethnicity in the African Diaspora, Paul E. Lovejoy and David Trotman, eds. London: Continuum, 2003

Invisible Muslims: The Sahelians in France, in Muslim Minorities in the West: Visible and Invisible, Yvonne Haddad and Jane Smith, eds. Altamira Press, 2002

American Slaves Who Were Readers and Writers, The Journal of Blacks in Higher Education, Summer 1999

Sadaqah Among African Muslims Enslaved in the Americas, The Journal of Islamic Studies, Oxford University Press, 1999

Senegalais de New York: Minorite Modele? Black Renaissance, Summer-Fall 1997

Exhibitions
Black New Yorkers 1613-2010
Black Power!
Power In Print
Ready For the Revolution: Education, Arts, and Aesthetics of the Black Power Movement
The Black Power Movement: The Legacy
Revisiting Nat Turner
Africans in India: From Slaves to Generals and Rulers (traveled to 20 countries)
The African Diaspora in the Indian Ocean World
Africana Age: African and African Diasporan Transformations in the 20th Century
African Americans and American Politics
The Abolition of the Transatlantic Slave Trade: The Forgotten Story
In Motion: The African American Migration Experience

Awards

2009 George Sulzby Award of the Alabama Historical Association for Dreams of Africa in Alabama: The Slave Ship Clotilda and the Story of the Last Africans Brought to America (Oxford University Press).
2009 Rosa Parks Award for Social Justice
2008 Wesley-Logan Prize of the American Historical Association for Dreams of Africa in Alabama: The Slave Ship Clotilda and the Story of the Last Africans Brought to America 
2008 Hurston/Wright Legacy Award, finalist, Dreams of Africa in Alabama: The Slave Ship Clotilda and the Story of the Last Africans Brought to America
2008 Pen and Brush Lifetime Achievement Award
2006 Dr. Betty Shabbazz Lifetime Achievement Award
2003 Comité des Mamans (France) Winner, Bintou Quatre Choux 
 2001 African Studies Association, Children Africana Book Award for Older Readers: Kings and Queens of West Africa 
 1999 Choice, Outstanding Academic Book for Servants of Allah: African Muslims Enslaved in the Americas 
1999 Gustavus Meyers Center for the Study of Human Rights in North America, Outstanding Books Award for Servants of Allah: African Muslims Enslaved in the Americas.

References

External links
Sylviane Diouf's home page
University of Washington profile

Year of birth missing (living people)
Living people
Women historians
Historians of Africa
Historians of slavery